Eagle Hills is a private real estate investment and development company based in Abu Dhabi, United Arab Emirates. The company is headed by Mohamed Alabbar, founder and managing director of Emaar Properties.

History 
Eagle Hills was established in 2014 in United Arab Emirates.

In April 2016, Eagle Hills unveiled The Address Fujairah Resort + Spa. In 2016, Eagle Hills partnered with local developer Diyar Al Muharraq to form Eagle Hills Diyar.

In January 2018, Sultan bin Mohammed Al Qasimi, Supreme Council Member and Ruler of Sharjah, unveiled three new projects in Sharjah — Maryam Island, Kalba Waterfront and Palace Al Khan. The projects have a combined value of AED 2.7 billion through a partnership between Eagle Hills and the Sharjah Investment & Development Authority (Shurooq). In November 2018, Eagle Hills launched La Gare, a new community (4,000 residences set in an area of over 360,000 sqm) located in Addis Ababa, in the setting of La Gare (‘The Station’ in French) train station.

In March 2019, Eagle Hills Properties was short-listed to lead the project City within the City in Zagreb, Croatia, and completed the first phase of residential developments within the Maryam Island with the sales launch of the residential units of Indigo Beach Residence.

The company is chaired by Mohamed Alabbar.

Selected projects

Morocco 
In June 2016, Eagle Hills began construction at Fairmont La Marina. In 2017, Eagle Hills announced a mixed-use development of 12 buildings in the Dar Es Salam district.

Oman 
In May 2018, Eagle Hills announced the launch of Mandarin Oriental, Muscat in Oman. The property was due to be developed by Eagle Hills Muscat, a partnership between Eagle Hills Abu Dhabi and Izz International, and managed by Mandarin Oriental Hotel Group. It was set to open in 2021.

Serbia 
In April 2015, Eagle Hills signed a joint venture agreement with representatives from the government of the Republic of Serbia for the Belgrade Waterfront, a new city hub along the Sava River. Construction work began on the first residential building in October 2015.

References

External links 
 Eagle Hills Website

Property companies of the United Arab Emirates
Commercial real estate companies